Danuria is a genus of African praying mantids in the family Deroplatyidae.

Species
Danuria affinis
Danuria angusticollis
Danuria barbozae
Danuria buchholzi
Danuria congica
Danuria contorta
Danuria fusca
Danuria gracilis
Danuria impannosa
Danuria kilimandjarica
Danuria obscuripennis
Danuria serratodentata
Danuria sublineata
Danuria thunbergi

See also
List of mantis genera and species

References

 
Mantidae